Damon Runyon Theater is an American television program that presented dramatized versions of Damon Runyon's short stories. Hosted by Donald Woods,  the program, sponsored by Anheuser-Busch's Budweiser beer, aired for a total of 39 episodes on CBS from April 1955 through February 1956 (repeats continued through June).

Sidney Miller directed the program.

Radio
Damon Runyon Theatre was broadcast on radio in the late 1940s. Actor John Brown had the role of Broadway, the narrator who often participated in the stories. Russell Hughes adapted Runyon's stories, including characters such as Harrigan, the Cop, Harry the Horse, Little Miss Marker, and Milk-Ear Willie. Richard Sanville directed the program, and Vern Carstensen was the producer. Stations that carried the show included WOR in New York and KGO in San Francisco.

Episode list

Season 1

Season 2

Guest Stars
Actors who appeared on the series included:
Jack Albertson
Gene Barry
Frances Bavier
Jack Carson
Dane Clark
Charles Coburn
Broderick Crawford
Paul Douglas
Edward Everett Horton
Mona Freeman
Coleen Gray
Barbara Hale
John Ireland
Dorothy Lamour
Thomas Mitchell
Hugh O'Brian
Edmond O'Brien
Cesar Romero
James Whitmore
Keenan Wynn
Fay Wray
Larry Roberts

References

External links

Damon Runyon Theatre at CVTA with episode list

1950s American anthology television series
CBS original programming
Black-and-white American television shows
1955 American television series debuts
1956 American television series endings
English-language television shows
Television series by Screen Gems